Abacetus idiomerus is a species of ground beetle in the subfamily Pterostichinae. It was described by Tschitscherine in 1900.

References

idiomerus
Beetles described in 1900